Lalita Prasad Vidyarthi (28 February 1931 – 1 December 1985) was an Indian anthropologist.

Life
Vidyarthi obtained his master's degree from Lucknow University in anthropology, studying under D. N. Majumdar. He received PhD from Chicago University in 1958 under the supervision of Robert Redfield and McKim Marriott. His doctoral dissertation was The sacred complex of a traditional city of Northern India.

He started his career as a professor at Ranchi College (under Bihar University), and served there from 1953 to 1956. He worked as a professor of anthropology at Ranchi University from 1958 to 1968, and became head of the department of anthropology in 1968. He served at this position till his death in 1985.

He died on 1 December 1985.

Works 
Vidyarthi believed that social scientists in India must explore the scriptures, such as the Vedas, the Upanishads, the Smritis, the Puranas and the Great Epics, if they are to acquire a sensitive insight into the social realities of India. He advocated for appreciation of traditional religion not to be swayed by those western scholars who proclaim only the negative influence of religion on development.

Vidyarthi declared that the social scientists must not ignore the Indian social thinkers like Sri Aurobindo, Rabindra Nath Tagore, Swami Vivekananda, Raja Ram Mohan Roy etc. who spoke in terms of "spiritual humanism, universal love and non-violence". He said of the tribal people:

It is for the Indian Anthropologists to take them seriously and not to be carried away by the voluminous writings of the Western Scholars who termed them to be 'animist', 'savages' and 'very different form the Hindus'.

In 1951, Vidyarthi learned of the Maler tribe, which according to him was one of the few primitive tribes of great anthropological interest in India. When he got to know about the excessive primitiveness of the isolated Malers, he decided to make them the object of his scientific investigation.

Vidyarthi explained how the ecological basis of forests and the slash-and-burn cultivation shaped the socio-economic life of the Maler tribe. He studied man in relation with man. Lastly, he presented the four types of Maler spirits, (Gossaiyan — the benevolent spirits, Jiwe Urrkya — the ancestors, Alchi — evil spirits and Chergani — spiritual power of a witch or witchcraft) in a framework of sacred geography, sacred performances, and sacred specialists. Nature, Man and spirit interact of necessity. This was the basis of the famous concept of Nature-Man-Spirit Complex proposed by Vidyarthi.

The another major concept that Vidyarthi brought into the Anthropological arena was that of a Sacred complex. His work The Sacred Complex in Hindu Gaya is considered to be one of the greatest contributions to the field of Anthropology. Gaya is a sacred city of Hindu pilgrimage. He described Gaya in terms of "a sacred geography", a set of "sacred performances" and a group of "sacred specialists". These three concepts are the ones comprising the "Sacred Complex", which is essentially a 'great tradition' in character. This great tradition is the one which reflects Hinduism and unites the diverse people of India.

Vidyarthi's study of Hindu Gaya demonstrated that the sacred complex establishes and maintains continuity and compromise between the traditions of the Hindu Civilisation.

Books 
 The Sacred Complex in Hindu Gaya, 1961
 The Maler: The Nature-Man-Spirit Complex in a Hill Tribe, 1963
 Aspects of Social Anthropology in India (with B. N. Sahay and P. K. Dutta), 1980
 Art and Culture of North East India, 1986
 The Kharia, then and now: a comparative study of Hill, Dhelki, and Dudh Kharia of the central-eastern region of India, 1980
 Leadership in India, 1967
 The sacred complex of Kashi: a microcosm of Indian civilization (with Makhan Jha and Baidyanath Saraswati), 1979
 Applied Anthropology and Development in India, 1980
 Aspects of Religion in Indian society (with  Dhirendra Nath Majumdar)
 Harijan today: Sociological, Economic, Political, Religious, and Cultural Analysis (with Narayan Mishra), 1977
 Conflict, Tension, and Cultural Trend in India, 1969
 Patterns of culture in South Asia, 1979
 Development of researches in Anthropology in India (with V.S. Upadhyaya)
 The Bio-Cultural Profiles of Tribal Bihar (with Ajit K. Singh), 1986
 Changing Dietary Patterns and Habits: A Socio-Cultural Study of Bihar (with Ramakant Prasad and Vijay S. Upadhyay), 1979
 The Tribal Culture of India, 2000
 Rural Development in South Asia, 1982
 Students unrest in Chotanagpur (1969–70), 1976

References

External links
 
 

1931 births
1985 deaths
Indian anthropologists
University of Lucknow alumni
Patna University alumni
Academic staff of Ranchi University
People from Patna district
20th-century anthropologists